Chris Brackett is a professional archer, bow expert, former host of Arrow Affliction.'

Brackett is from Bartonville, Illinois. He is the founder of Brackett Outdoors, which organizes several outdoor activities including bowfishing.

In 2008, Brackett hosted the show Arrow Affliction on Sportsman Channel. After that, he has served as a trainer in History Channel's Top Shot and has started other projects like Outdoor Channel's Fear No Evil, with Zac Brown.

In early 2016 Brackett achieved notoriety in social media and the outdoor press resulting from a Pittsburgh Post-Gazette article in which he was quoted claiming Chronic Wasting Disease is not fatal.  (“There has never been an animal die of CWD,” Brackett said. “Never, never, never.”)  He also attributed the source of CWD as being "...from nuclear testing out West,"  These claims were widely debunked.

References

External links
Official Website
 

Living people
American male sport shooters
Year of birth missing (living people)